Marycha is a small river that serves as the natural Polish–Lithuanian and Lithuanian–Belarusian border. It starts around Puńsk, flows through the town of Sejny, passes through Pomorze Lake. It is a tributary of Czarna Hańcza.

External links  

International rivers of Europe
Rivers of Grodno Region
Rivers of Lithuania
Rivers of Poland
Rivers of Podlaskie Voivodeship
Lithuania–Poland border
Belarus–Lithuania border
Rivers of Belarus